The Spain women's junior national handball team is the national under-19 handball team of Spain. Controlled by the Royal Spanish Handball Federation it represents Spain in international matches.

History

IHF World Championship 

 Champions   Runners up   Third place   Fourth place

European Championship 
 Champions   Runners up   Third place   Fourth place

References

External links 

 *Official website 

Handball in Spain
Women's national junior handball teams
Handball